The Țibrin is a right tributary of the Danube in Romania. It passes through the artificial Lake Țibrin and flows into the Danube in Seimeni.

References

Rivers of Romania
Rivers of Constanța County